This is a list of ski areas and resorts in Japan. The list includes areas operating now.

Hokkaidō

Sōya Subprefecture 

 Esashi Town Mikasayama Ski Area
 Nakatonbetsu Town Kotobuki Ski Area
 Saroma Town Ski Area
 Sarufutsu Village Ski Area
 Tenpoku Ski Area
 Toyotomi Town Toyotomi Onsen Ski Area
 Wakkanai City Komadori Ski Area

Kamikawa Subprefecture 

 Alpha Resort Tomamu
 Asahi Ski Area
 Asahigatake Ski Course
 Asahiyama City Ski Area
 Bifuka Ski Area
 Canmore Ski Village
 Daisetsuzan Kurodake Ski Area
 Furano Skiing Ground
 Hinode Ski Area
 Inosawa City Ski Area
 Kamui Ski Links
 Kenbuchi Town Bibakarasu Ski Area
 Minami Furano Ski Area
 Nakafurano Hokusei Ski Area
 Nayoro Piyashiri Ski Area
 Otoi Fuji Ski Area
 Pippu Ski Area
 Santa Present Park Mallows Gelände
 Shibetsu City Hinata Ski Area
 Shirogane Ski Highland Park Hill Valley
 Tōma Town Ski Area
 Wassamu Higashiyama Ski Area

Rumoi Subprefecture 

 Horonobe Town Higashigaoka Ski Area
 Mashike Town Shokanbetsudake Ski Area
 Obira Town Bōyōdai Ski Area
 Teshio Town Ski Area

Abashiri Subprefecture 

 Abashiri Lake View Ski Area
 Engaru Rock Valley Ski Area
 Kamiyūbetsu Town Gokazan Ski Area
 Kitami Wakamatsu City Ski Area
 Kiyosato Town Midori Ski Area
 Monbetsu City Ōyama Ski Area
 Oketo Town Minamigaoka Ski Area
 Okoppe Town Ski Area
 Rubeshibe Town Happōdai Ski Area
 Ski Mebius
 Takinoue Town Sakuragaoka Ski Area

Nemuro Subprefecture 

 Kanayama Ski Area
 Rausu Town Ski Area

Kushiro Subprefecture 

 Akan Kohan Ski Area
 Akan Royal Valley Ski Area
 Birao Ski Area

Tokachi Subprefecture 

 Chūrui Village Shiroganedai Ski Area
 Memuro Ski Area
 Nisshō Ski Area
 Nukabira Onsen Ski Area
 Sahoro Resort
 Shintokuyama Ski Area

Sorachi Subprefecture 

 Ashibetsu Ski Area
 Bibai Ski Area
 Fukagawa Ski Area
 Horotachi Ski Area
 Iwamizawa Haginoyama City Ski Gelände
 Kamoidake Kokusai Ski Area
 Kuriyama Town Ski Area
 Mitsui Greenland White Park
 Mount Akabira Ski Area
 Mt. Racey
 Naganuma Ski Area
 Numata Town Takaho Ski Area
 Shintotsukawa Town Socchidake Ski Area
 Tsukigata Town Ski Area

Hidaka Subprefecture 

 Hidaka Kokusai Ski Area

Ishikari Subprefecture 

 Atsuta Village Ski Area
 Eniwa City Ski Area
 Fu's Snow Area
 Hamamasu Village Ski Area
 Ishikari Heigen Skiing Ground
 Kōrakuen Kitahiroshima Ski Land
 Sapporo Bankei Ski Area
 Sapporo Kitahiroshima Prince Family Ski Area
 Sapporo Kokusai Ski Area
 Sapporo Moiwayama Ski Area
 Sapporo Teine
 Takino Snow World

Shiribeshi Subprefecture 

 

 Asarigawa Onsen Ski Area
 Furubira Kazoku Ryokōmura Ski Area
 Kiroro Snow World
 Kutchan Town Asahigaoka Ski Area
 Nakayamatōge Ski Area
 Niki Town Ski Area
 Niseko Annupuri International Ski Resort
 Niseko Higashiyama Ski Resort
 Niseko Moiwa Ski Area
 Niseko Mt. Resort Grand Hirafu
 Niseko Weiss Ski Area
 Otaru Tenguyama Ski Area
 Rankoshi Town Chisenupuri Ski Area
 Rusutsu Resort
 Shakotan Town Outdoor Sports Forest Ski Area
 Snow Cruise Onze

Iburi Subprefecture 

 Anpeizan Ski Area
 Hobetsu Ski Area
 Muroran Kōgen Danpara Ski Area
 Noboribetsu Kōgen Karls Onsen Sanlaiva
 Orofure Ski Area
 Windsor Snow Village

Oshima Subprefecture 

 Greenpia Ōnuma Ski Area
 Hakodate Nanae Ski Area
 Niyama Kōgen Ski Area

Hiyama Subprefecture 

 Imakane Town Pirika Ski Area

Tōhoku region

Aomori Prefecture 

 Ajigasawa Ōtakayama Ski Resort
 Hakkōda Ski Area
 Imabetsu Ski Area
 Iwakiyama Hyakuzawa Ski Area
 Iwakiyama Skyline Ski Area
 Kamafuseyama Ski Area
 Makado Onsen Ski Area
 Moya Hills
 Aomori Spring Ski Resort
 Ōwani Onsen Ski Area
 Shichinohe Town Ski Area
 Sōma Romantopia Ski Area
 Takko 229 Ski Land
 Tōō Ski Area
 Towadako Onsen Ski Area
 Yagoshiyama Skiing Area

Iwate Prefecture 

 Amihari Onsen Ski Area
 Appi Kogen Ski Resort
 Getō Kōgen Ski Area
 Hachimantai Resort Ski Area
 Hachimantai Ski Area
 Hayasaka Kōgen Snow Land
 Himekayu Ski Area
 Iwate Kōgen Snowpark
 Iwayama Park Land Ski Area
 Kunimidaira Ski Area
 Matsurube Snow Park
 Morioka Highland Ski Area
 Nishiwaga Town Yuda Ski Area
 Okunakayama Kōgen Ski Area
 Ōshū City Koeji Ski Area
 Shizukuishi Ski Area
 Tōno City Akahane Ski Area

Miyagi Prefecture 

 Izumigatake Ski Area
 Miyagi Zaō Eboshi Ski Area
 Miyagi Zaō Shichikashuku Ski Area
 Miyagi Zaō Shiraishi Ski Area
 Miyagi Zaō Sumikawa Snow Park Ski Area
 Resort Park Onikōbe Ski Area
 Spring Valley Izumi Kōgen Ski Area
 St. Mary Ski Resorts
 Yakurai Family Ski Area

Akita Prefecture 

 Akita Hachimantai Ski Area
 Akita Prefecture Tazawako Ski Area
 Ani Ski Area
 Chōkai Kōgen Yashima Ski Area
 Fujisato Town Ski Area
 Gosannen Ski Area
 Hanawa Ski Area
 Jeunesse Kurikoma Ski Slope
 Kyōwa Ski Area
 Ohdai ski Resort
 Ōmagari Family Ski Area
 Suishōzan Ski Area
 Taiheizan Ski Area Opas
 Tengamori Ski Area

Yamagata Prefecture 

 Akiyama Ski Area
 Asahi Shizenkan Snow Park
 Crico International Ski Area
 Gassan Ski Area
 Hagurosan Ski Area
 Kamuro Ski Area
 Kurobushi Kōgen Snow Park Jangle Jungle
 Matsuyama Ski Area
 Omoshiroyama Kōgen Ski Park
 Satoyama Ski Area
 Shinjo Ski Area
 Tendō Kōgen Ski Area
 Tengendai Kōgen Ski Area
 Yamagata Akakura Onsen Ski Area
 Yamagata Zao Onsen Ski Resort
The largest single ski resort in Japan, .
 Yonezawa Ski Area
 Yudonosan Ski Area
 Zaō Liza Ski World
 Zaō Sarukura Ski Area

Fukushima Prefecture 

 Adatara Kōgen Ski Resort
 Aizu Kōgen Daikura Ski Area
 Aizu Kōgen Nangō Ski Area
 Aizu Kōgen Takahata Ski Area
 Aizu Kōgen Takatsue Ski Area
 Aizubange Town Ski Area
 Alts Snow Park & Resort
 Azuma Ski Area
 Bandai Kokusai Ski Area
 Fairy Land Kaneyama Ski Area
 Gran Deco Snow Resort
 Grandee Hatoriko Ski Resort
 Hinoemata Onsen Ski Area
 Inawashiro Resort Ski Area
 Inawashiro Ski Area
 Listel Ski Fantasia
 Minowa Ski Area
 Nihonmatsu Shiozawa Ski Area
 Numajiri Ski Area
 Sannokura Ski Area
 Ski Resort Ten-ei
 Tadami Ski Area
 Ura Bandai Nekoma Ski Area
 Ura Bandai Ski Area
 Yanaizu Onsen Ski Area
 Yokomuki Onsen Ski Area

Kantō region

Ibaraki Prefecture 

 Kamui Ryūgasaki Snowboard Park (Indoor)

Tochigi Prefecture 

 Edelweiss Ski Resort
 Hunter Mt. Shiobara
 Kōtoku Cross-Country Ski Area
 Mt. Jeans Ski Resort Nasu
 Nasu Onsen Family Ski Area
 Nikkō Kirifuri Kōgen Ski Area
 Nikkō Shōbugahama Ski Area
 Nikkō Yumoto Ski Area

Gunma Prefecture 

 Akagiyama Ski Area
 Caetla Ski Resort Oze
 Hotaka Bokujō Ski Area
 Katashina Kōgen Ski Area
 Kawaba Ski Area
 Kazawa Snow Area
 Kusatsu Kokusai Snow & Spa Resort
 Kusatsu Ongaku no Mori Ski Area
 Malnuma Kōgen Ski Area
 Manza Onsen Ski Resort
 Minakami Hōdaigi Ski Area
 Minakami Kōgen Fujiwara Ski Area
 Minakami Kōgen Ski Area
 Minakami Ōana Ski Area
 Minakami Town Akasawa Ski Area
 Norn Minakami Ski Resort
 Okutone Snow Park
 Omote Manza Snow Park
 Palcall Tsumagoi Ski Area
 President Snow Park Karuizawa

 Shiki no Mori White World Oze Iwakura
 Snow Par Ogna Hotaka
 Snow Park Oze Tokura
 Tanbara Ski Park
 Tanigawa Onsen White Valley Ski Area
 Tanigawadake Tenjindaira Ski Area

Saitama Prefecture 

 Sayama Ski & Snowboard (Indoor)

Kanagawa Prefecture 

 Snova Mizonokuchi (Indoor)
 Snova Shinyokohama (Indoor)

Chūbu region

Niigata Prefecture

 Arai Funaokayama Ski Area (closed)
 Arai Mountain Resort & Spa (closed April 2006, re-opened Dec 2017)
 Axiom Ski Area
 Budō Ski Area
 Centleisure Maiko Snow Resort
 Charmant Hiuchi Ski Resort
 Chateau Shiosawa Ski Area
 Cupid Valley (New Owners 2020/21) 
 First Ishiuchi Ski Area
 Fuyudorigoe Ski Garden
 Gala Yuzawa Snow Resort
 Garuru Takayanagi Ski Area
 Hakkai Sanroku Ski Area
 Ipponsugi Ski Area
 Ishiuchi Hanaoka Ski Area
 Ishiuchi Maruyama Ski Area
 Itoigawa Seaside Valley Ski Areas
 Itsukamachi Ski Area
 Iwa-ppara Ski Area
 Jōetsu Kokusai Ski Resort
 Kakumanji Ski Area
 Kanai Town Taira Ski Area
 Kanayayama Ski Area
 Kan'etsu Kokusai Ōhara Ski Area
 Kawaguchi Ski Area
 Kayama Captain Coast Ski Area
 Kiyokawa Kōgen Ski Area
 Koide Ski Area
 Kokusetsu Tainai Ski Area
 Koshi Kōgen Ski Area
 Ludens Yuzawa Ski Resort
 Matsunoyama Onsen Ski Area
 Mikawa Onsen Ski Area
 Mountain Park Tsunan Ski Area
 Mt. Grand View Ski Area

 Mt. Naeba
 Kagura Ski Resort
 Naeba Ski Resort – With the longest aerial lift in Japan, .
 Muikamachi Hakkaisan Ski Area
 Muikamachi Minami Ski Area
 Myōkōkogen Ski Resorts - includes ski areas in both Niigata and Nagano
 (in Niigata)
 Akakura Kankō Resort Ski Area
 Akakura Onsen Ski Area – The oldest ski resort in Japan, from 1937.
 APA Resort Myōkō Pine Valley (Closed 2009)
 Ikenotaira Onsen Ski Area
 Kyukamura Ski Area
 Seki Onsen Ski Area
 Myōkō Ski Park
 Panorama Park Ski Area (Closed 1996)
 Suginohara Ski Area – Possesses the longest run in Japan (8.5 km) 
 Tsubame Onsen Ski Area (shut down)
 (in Nagano)
 Kurohime Kōgen Snow Park
 Madarao Kōgen Ski Area
 Madarao Kōgen Sympathique Ski Area (Closed 2018) 
 Madarao Kōgen Toyota Ski Area (Closed 2015) 
 Tangram Ski Circus
 Nagaoka City Ski Area
 Nagaoka Country Club Ski Area
 Nakajō Katsura Ski Area
 Nakajō Town Ski Area
 Nakamine Ski Area
 Nakasato Kiyotsu Ski Area
 Nakasato Snow Wood Ski Area
 Naspa Ski Garden
 National Park Resort Villages Myōkō Ski Area
 New Greenpia Tsunan Ski Area
 Ninohji Snow Park Ninox
 Ojiya Ski Area
 Oku Tadami Maruyama Ski Area
 Ōyu Onsen Ski Area
 Pine Ridge Resorts Kandatsu Ski Area
 Sportscom Urasa Kokusai Ski Area
 Sugihara Ski Area
 Tainai Ski Area (Closed 2020)
 Tochio Family Ski Area
 Tōkamachi City Matsudai Family Ski Area
 Tōkamachi City Ski Area
 Tsunogami Ski Area
 Ugawa Ski Area
 Uonuma City Ōhara Ski Area
 Urasa Ski Area
 Wakabuna Kōgen Ski Area
 Wonder Valley Sado Ski Area
 Yakeyama Onsen Ski Area
 Yakushi Ski Area
 Yasuda Town Ski Area
 Yoshikawa Rokkakuyama Ski Area
 Yūkyūzan Ski Area
 Yuzawa Kōgen Ski Area
 Yuzawa Nakazato Ski Area
 Yuzawa Park Ski Area

Toyama Prefecture 

 Iox-Arosa
 Kanjōji Ski Area
 Sarukurayama Ski Area
 Snow Valley Toga
 Taira Ski Area
 Takanbō Ski Area
 Tateyama Sangaku Ski Area
 Tateyama Sanroku Ski Area
 Awasuno Ski Area
 Gokurakuzaka Area
 Raichō Valley Area
 Unazuki Onsen Ski Area
 Ushidake Onsen Ski Area
 Yumenotaira Ski Area

Ishikawa Prefecture 

 Hakusan Chūgū Onsen Ski Area
 Hakusan Ichirino Onsen Ski Area
 Hakusan Seme Kōgen Ski Area
 Hakusan Shiramine Onsen Ski Area
 Iōzen Ski Area
 Kanazawa Seymour Ski Area
 Kurokawa Onsen Ski Area
 Nanao Korosa Ski Area
 Nishiyama Cross-Country Ski Area
 Ōkuradake Kōgen Ski Area
 Shishiku Kōgen Ski Area
 Torigoe Kōgen Dainichi Ski Area
 Wajima City Mitsui Ski Area

Fukui Prefecture 

 Fukui Izumi Ski Area
 Imajō 365
 Kadohara Ski Area
 Karigahara Ski Area
 Kuzuryū Ski Area
 Rokuroshi Kōgen Ski Area
 Ski Jam Katsuyama

Shizuoka Prefecture 

 Ōkubo Grass Ski Area
 River Well Ikawa Ski Area
 Snow Town Yeti

Yamanashi Prefecture 

 Fujiten Snow Resort
 Kamui Misaka Ski Area
 Sun Meadows Ōizumi Kiyosato Ski Area

Nagano Prefecture 

 Araragi Kōgen Ski Area
 Asahi Prime Ski Area
 Asama 2000 Park
 Banshogahara Ski Area
 Blanche Takayama Ski Resort
 Chateraise Ski Resort Yatsugadake
 Chūō-dō Ina Ski Resort
 Echo Valley Ski Area
 Fujimi Kōgen Ski Area
 Fujimi Panorama Resort

 Hakuba 47 Winter Sports Park
 Hakuba Cortina Kokusai Ski Area
 Hakuba Goryū Ski Resort
 Hakuba Happoone Winter Resort
 Hakuba Highland Ski Area
 Iwatake Ski Area
 Hakuba Minekata Ski Area
 Hakuba Norikura Onsen Ski Area
 Heavens Sonohara Snow World
 Hijiri Kōgen Ski Area
 Hijiriyama Panorama Ski Area
 Hiraya Kōgen Akasaka Ski Area
 Hokuryūko Family Ski Area
 Iizuna Kogen Ski Area (Closed 2020)
 Iizuna Resort Ski Area
 Jibuzaka Kōgen Ski Area
 Jiigatake Ski Area
 Kaida Kōgen MIA Ski Resort
 Karuizawa Skate Center Snowboard Park
 Kirigamine Ski Area
 Kiso Fukushima Ski Area
 Kita Shiga Kōgen Komaruyama Ski Area
 Kita Shiga Kōgen Yomase Onsen Ski Area
 Kita Shiga Takai Fuji Ski Area
 Kita Shinshū Kijimadaira Ski Area

 Komagane Kōgen Ski Area
 Koumi Ri-Ex Ski Valley
 Kurohime Kōgen Snow Park
 Kurumayama Kōgen Snow Resort
 Madarao Kōgen Ski Area
 Madarao Kōgen Sympathique Ski Area (Closed 2018) 
 Madarao Kōgen Toyota Ski Area (Closed 2015) 
 Makinoiri Snow Park
 Minenohara Kōgen Ski Area
 Norikura Kōgen Igaya Ski Area
 Norikura Kōgen Snow + Spa Resort
 Nozawa Onsen Snow Resort
 Ōmachi Ski Area
 Ontake Ropeway Ski Area
 Ontake 2240
 Pilatus Tateshina Ski Resort
 Prince Snow Resort Karuizawa
 Racing Camp Nobeyama
 Ryuoo Ski Park
 Sakae Club Ski Area
 Saku Ski Garden Parada
 Senjōjiki Ski Area
 Shiga Kōgen Ski Resort
 Hasuike / Maruike / Sun Valley area:
 Giant Ski Area
 Hasuike Ski Area
 Maruike Ski Area
 Sun Valley Ski Area
 Higashitateyama / Ichinose / Takamagahara area:
 Higashitateyama Ski Area
 Ichinose Diamond Ski Area
 Ichinose Family Ski Area
 Ichinose Yamanokami Ski Area
 Nishitateyama Ski Area
 Takamagahara Mammoth Ski Area
 Tanne no Mori Okojo Ski Area
 Terakoya Ski Area
 Okushiga Kōgen / Yakebitaiyama area:
 Okushiga Kōgen Ski Area
 Yakibitaiyama Ski Area
 Kumanoyu / Shibutōge / Yokoteyama area:
 Kasadake Ski Area
 Kidoike Ski Area
 Kumanoyu Ski Area
 Maeyama Ski Area
 Shibutōge Ski Area
 Yokoteyama Ski Area
Shiga Kōgen is the largest ski resort complex in Japan, 85 courses.
 Shinshū Matsumoto Nomugitōge Ski Area
 Shirakaba 2 in 1 Ski Area
 Shirakaba Kōgen Kokusai Ski Area
 Shirakaba Resort Ski Area
 Shirakabako Royal Hill
 Snowboard World Heights
 Sugadaira Kōgen Snow Resort
 Davos Area
 Taro Area
 Pine Beak Area
 Sun Alpina Aokiko Ski Area
 Sun Alpina Hakuba Sanosaka Ski Resort
 Sun Alpina Kashimayari Ski Area
 Tangram Ski Circus
 Tateshina Tōkyū Ski Resort
 Togakushi Snow World
 Togari Onsen Ski Area
 Tsugaike Kōgen Ski Area
 Yabuhara Kōgen Ski Area
 Yachiho Kōgen Ski Resort
 Yamada Bokujō Ski Area
 Yamada Onsen Ski Area
 Yanaba Ski Area
 Yunomaru Ski Area

Gifu Prefecture 

 Ciao Ontake Snow Resort
 Dynaland
 Gujō Kōgen Ski Area
 Harayama City Ski Area
 Hida Funayama Snow Resort Arkopia
 Hida Kawai Ski Area
 Hida Norikura Pentapia Snow World
 Hida Takayama Ski Area
 Hirayu Onsen Ski Area
 Hirugano Kōgen Ski Area
 Hōnokidaira Ski Area
 Ibi Kōgen Ski Area
 Isshiki Kokusai Ski Area
 Itoshiro Charlotte Town
 Kasuga Chōjadaira Ski Area
 Kunimi Takeshi Ski Area
 Meihō Ski Area
 Mont Deus Hida Kuraiyama Snow Park
 Nigorigo Onsen Ski Area
 Outdoor Inn Motai
 Shirakawagō Hirase Onsen Shiroyumi Ski Area
 Shirao Ski Area
 Shōkawa Kōgen Ski Area
 Snova Hashima (Indoor)
 Snow Wave Park Shiratori Kōgen
 Star Spure Ryokufū Resort Hida Nagareha
 Takasu Snow Park
 Washigatake Ski Area
 White Pia Takasu
 Winghills Shirotori Resort
 Youland Sakauchi

Aichi Prefecture 

 Chausuyama Kōgen Ski Area

Mie Prefecture 

 Gozaisho Ski Area

Kansai region

Shiga Prefecture

 Akagoyama Ski Area
 Berg Yogo
 Biwako Valley
 Hakodateyama Ski Area
 Ibukiyama Ski Area
 Kunizakai Ski Area
 Makino Kōgen Ski Area
 Oku Ibuki Ski Area
 Yogo Kōgen Ski Area

Kyōto Prefecture 

 Kyōto Hirogawara Ski Area
 Ōeyama Ski Area
 Yasakae Town Swiss Village Ski Area

Hyōgo Prefecture 

 Banshū Tokura Ski Area
 Chikusa Kōgen Ski Area
 Hachi Kōgen Ski Area
 Hachikita Ski Area
 Hyperbowl Tōhachi
 Hyōnosen Kokusai Ski Area
 Kannabe Kōgen Ski Area
 Manba Ski Area
 Nashiki Ski Area
 Oku Kannabe Ski Area
 Up Kannabe Ski Area
 Mikata Snow Park
 Mt. Rokkō Artificial Snow Area
 Shin Tokura Ski Area
 Sky Valley Ski Area
 Tajima Bokujō Kōen Ski Area
 Wakasu Kōgen Ōya Ski Area

Nara Prefecture 

 Dorogawa Ski Area
 Myōjintaira Ski Area
 Wasamatayama Ski Area

Chūgoku region

Tottori Prefecture 

 Daisen Ski Area
 Daisen Kokusai Ski Area
 Gōenzan Ski Area
 Nakanohara Ski Area
 Uenohara Ski Area
 Hanamiyama Ski Area
 Kagamiganaru Ski Area
 Masumizu Kōgen Ski Area
 Oku Daisen Ski Area
 Wakasa Hyōnosen Ski Area

Shimane Prefecture 

 Asahi Tengusuton
 Kotobiki Forest Park
 Miinohara Ski Area
 Mizuho Highland
 Sanbe Onsen Ski Area
 Akana Ski Area

Okayama Prefecture 

 Chiya Ski Area
 Hiruzen Bear Valley Ski Area
 Ibuki no Sato Ski Area
 Onbara Kōgen Ski Area

Hiroshima Prefecture 

 Azumayama Ski Area
 Dōgoyama Kōgen Ski Area
 Geihoku Bunka Land
 Hiroshima Kenmin no Mori
 Megahira Onsen Megahira
 Ōsa Ski Area
 Osorakan Ski Area
 Pine Ridge Resorts Geihoku
 Ringo Kyōwakoku Ski Area
 Ski Park Kanbiki
 Snow Resort Nekoyama
 Utopia Saioto
 Yawata Kōgen 191

Yamaguchi Prefecture 

 Tokusagamine Ski Area
 Rakanzan Highland

Shikoku region

Kagawa Prefecture 

 Snow Park Unpenji

Tokushima Prefecture 

 Ikawa Ski Area Kainayama
 Kenzan Ski Area

Ehime Prefecture 

 Across Shigenobu (Indoor)
 Ishizuchi Ski Area
 Kuma Ski Land
 Mikawa Ski Area
 Salega Land Plana
 Sol-Fa Oda Ski Gelände

Kōchi Prefecture 

 Tengu Kōgen Ski Area

Kyūshū region

Fukuoka Prefecture 

 Big Air Fukuoka (Indoor)

Saga Prefecture 

 Tenzan Ski Resort

Ōita Prefecture 

 Kujū Shinrin Kōen Ski Area

Miyazaki Prefecture 

 Gokase Highland Ski Area

See also 
 List of ski areas and resorts

References

External links
 
 Joetsu Myoko Ski Resorts

Japan
 
Ski areas